Róbert Hanko (born 28 December 1976) is a retired Slovak football midfielder.

References

1976 births
Living people
Slovak footballers
AS Trenčín players
Karlsruher SC players
OFK 1948 Veľký Lapáš players
1. FC Tatran Prešov players
Regionalliga players
Association football midfielders
Slovakia international footballers
Slovak expatriate footballers
Expatriate footballers in Germany
Slovak expatriate sportspeople in Germany